Giovanni Battista Zuccato (1543 - 14 April 1618) was a Roman Catholic prelate who served as Bishop of Nusco (1607–1614).

Biography
On 19 November 1607, Giovanni Battista Zuccato was appointed by Pope Paul V as Bishop of Nusco.
He served as Bishop of Nusco until his resignation in 1614. 
He died on 14 April 1618.

See also 
Catholic Church in Italy

References

External links and additional sources
 (for Chronology of Bishops) 
 (for Chronology of Bishops) 

17th-century Italian Roman Catholic bishops
1543 births
1618 deaths
Clergy from Milan
Bishops appointed by Pope Paul V